Eacles mayi is a moth in the family Saturniidae. It is found in Brazil.

References

 , 2010: Saturniidae from Santa Catarina State, Brazil, with taxonomic notes (Lepidoptera). Nachr. Entomol. Ver. Apollo N.F. 30 (4): 215-220.

Ceratocampinae
Moths described in 1920